Monica Seles and Ai Sugiyama were the defending champions but only Seles competed that year with Anna Kournikova.

Kournikova and Seles won in the final 6–4, 6–4 against Mary Joe Fernández and Arantxa Sánchez Vicario.

Seeds
Champion seeds are indicated in bold text while text in italics indicates the round in which those seeds were eliminated.

 Lisa Raymond /  Rennae Stubbs (semifinals)
 Julie Halard-Decugis /  Mirjana Lučić (quarterfinals)
 Kerry-Anne Guse /  Sung-Hee Park (quarterfinals)
 Anna Kournikova /  Monica Seles (champions)

Draw

External links
 1998 Toyota Princess Cup Doubles Draw 

Toyota Princess Cup
1998 WTA Tour